Ilija Sivonjić (born 13 January 1987) is a Croatian professional footballer.

Club career
Sivonjić started his senior career in top flight, debuting for Kamen Ingrad on 21 May 2005. He spent three seasons playing as midfielder and scored 9 goals in 49 appearances. Following Kamen's relegation at the end of the 2006–07 season, he was bought by Inter Zaprešić and made his first appearance for the club on 14 September 2007 against Međimurje, netting a brace in his debut. He ended the 2007–08 season with 4 goals in 21 appearances. In the 2008–09 season Sivonjić was Inter's top goalscorer before he was transferred to Croatian champions Dinamo Zagreb on 18 December 2008. In his debut season for Dinamo Sivonjič made 14 league and 3 more in the Croatian Cup, scoring 4 goals. Sivonjić started 2009–10 season with a goal at Dinamo's opening league match against Istra 1961 and also came in as a late substitute in Champions League match against Pyunik. Between 2014 and 2018 Sivonjić played for a string of lower-tier German clubs followed by a season at the Belgian 6th tier team KAV Dendermonde.

National team
Sivonjić was capped four times in Croatia's under–19 team, all in 2006 in their under–19 European Championship qualifying campaign. He is also eligible to play for the Bosnia and Herzegovina national team.

Honours
Dinamo Zagreb
 Prva HNL: 2008–09
 Croatian Cup: 2009
 Croatian Supercup: 2010

Career statistics

References

External links
 

1987 births
Living people
People from Central Bosnia Canton
Croats of Bosnia and Herzegovina
Association football forwards
Croatian footballers
Croatia youth international footballers
NK Kamen Ingrad players
NK Inter Zaprešić players
GNK Dinamo Zagreb players
NK Lokomotiva Zagreb players
HNK Rijeka players
NK Hrvatski Dragovoljac players
Croatian Football League players
First Football League (Croatia) players
Croatian expatriate footballers
Expatriate footballers in Germany
Croatian expatriate sportspeople in Germany
Expatriate footballers in Belgium
Croatian expatriate sportspeople in Belgium